The 1973–74 Texaco Cup was the fourth edition of the tournament sponsored by Texaco. It was won by Newcastle United, who beat Burnley 2–1 in the only match in the final this season.

First Round 1st Leg

First Round 2nd Leg

Quarter-finals 1st Leg

Quarter-finals 2nd Leg

Semi-finals 1st Leg

Semi-finals 2nd Leg

Final

Notes and references

1973–74 in English football
1973–74 in Scottish football
England–Scotland relations